Decibels is the eighth studio album by Canadian speed/thrash metal band Razor. This was the band's first album since 1991's Open Hostility and since their split in 1992, as well as the only album to feature drummer Rich Oosterbosch and the last with bassist Jon Armstrong.

Track listing

Notes
 Despite the additional bonus track on the original CD release, it is not listed on the track list. The 2004 CD re-issue by Blackend Records omits it
 The 1st pressing of the 2011 12" limited edition vinyl re-issue by High Roller Records features an alternate track list and cover art. Issued in 425g carton cover with printed cardboard lyric sheet, contains two bonus tracks, limited to 450 copies on black vinyl. The vinyl on the 2nd pressing was released in aqua blue with same contents, limited to 100 copies. The vinyl on the 3rd pressing was released in swamp green with same contents, limited to 200 copies

Personnel 
Bob Reid - Lead Vocals
Dave Carlo - Lead Guitars
Jon Armstrong - Bass
Rich Oosterbosch - Drums

Production
Dave Carlo - Producer
Bob Reid - Producer
Tom Treumuth - Executive producer
Daryn Barry - Engineering
Alfio Annibalini - Engineering
Darko - Photography
Roland - Cover model

References

Razor (band) albums
Thrash metal albums
Groove metal albums
Nu metal albums
1997 albums